Handbook on History of the Communist Party and the Soviet Union 1898–1991 is a Russophone free access online encyclopedic information on history of the Communist Party of the USSR and its members.

The project is created on the initiative of Nafthali Hirschkowitz (Zikhron Yaakov), a creator and editor of the project. He is assisted by several specialists in a field of history across a vast territory of the former Soviet Union. Among those are experts in a field of historical science and others. The project started in 2005.

See also
 Great Soviet Encyclopedia

External links
Official website
List of bibliography on which the information of the project is based

Soviet encyclopedias
21st-century encyclopedias
Russian online encyclopedias